The 2013 Major League Lacrosse season was the 13th season of the league.  The season began on April 27, 2013 and concluded with the championship game on August 25, 2013.

Milestones and events

Coaching changes
On June 10, 2013, the Boston Cannons fired head coach Steve Duffy after a 1-5 start and replaced him with John Tucker.

On June 24, 2013, the Ohio Machine fired head coach Ted Garber after a 1-7 start to the season and replaced him with Bear Davis.

Name changes
On December 14, 2012, the Long Island Lizards changed their name to the New York Lizards.

Neutral-location games
The league will host three games in neutral locations.

In addition, the New York Lizards will play two of its seven home games at Icahn Stadium.

Other
On April 22, 2013, MLL and YouTube agreed to an exclusive fifteen-game schedule.

On July 4, 2013, the Denver Outlaws broke the MLL attendance record for the eighth year in a row as 31,019 fans poured into Sports Authority Field at Mile High to watch the Outlaws defeat the New York Lizards, 16-7. Denver also became the first MLL team ever to start a season 10-0 with the win, and they carried this on the finish with the first perfect regular season in the thirteen years of the competition. Previously, in fact, no team had gone through an MLL regular season with only one loss, yet alone without losing. The most recent teams to lose two regular season games were the Outlaws and the Philadelphia Barrage in 2006.

The 2013 season marked the last season for the Hamilton Nationals. The dissolved Nationals team will form the basis of the Florida Launch for the 2014 season.

Standings 

Chesapeake and Hamilton split their two regular-season games. Chesapeake outscored Hamilton 28-22 in those two games to finish second.

All Star Game 
Team Supernova defeated Team Eclipse 24-15 in the 2013 MLL All-Star Game, presented by Moe's Southwest Grill from American Legion Memorial Stadium in Charlotte, N.C on Saturday July 13, 2013. Hamilton's Kevin Crowley was named the Most Valuable Player.

Playoffs
August 24 and 25 PPL Park, in Chester, PA.

Annual awards

References

External links
 Official Site

13
Major League Lacrosse